Talk About It  is the fourth album by Christian singer-songwriter Nicole C. Mullen. The album includes the single and music video "Call On Jesus." Mullen won a 2001 Dove award for Female Vocalist of the Year.

Track listing

Chart history

References

External links 
 

2001 albums
Nicole C. Mullen albums
Word Records albums